The 2019 British Athletics Championships was the national championship in outdoor track and field for athletes in the United Kingdom, held from 24 to 25 August 2019 at Alexander Stadium in Birmingham. It was organised by UK Athletics. A full range of outdoor events were held up to 5000 metres. The competition served as the main selection event for the 2019 World Athletics Championships.

The British Championships for 10,000 metres were held during the European 10,000m Cup as part of the Night of 10,000 metres PBs event at Highgate Stadium on 6 July. This event also served as the main qualification event for the 2019 World Championships 10,000 m.

Selections for the men's and women's marathons were based on results in the 2019 London Marathon.

Results

Men

Women

References

Results
British Championships Birmingham 24-25 Aug 19. Power of 10. Retrieved 2020-12-20.

External links
British Athletics

British Athletics Championships
British Outdoor Championships
Athletics Outdoor
Athletics Championships
Sports competitions in Birmingham, West Midlands